Medinilla is a genus of about 400 species of flowering plants in the family Melastomataceae, native to tropical regions of the Old World from Africa (two species) east through Madagascar (about 70 species) and southern Asia to the western Pacific Ocean islands. The genus was named after J. de Medinilla, governor of the Mariana Islands in 1820.

They are evergreen shrubs or lianas. The leaves are opposite or whorled, or alternate in some species. The flowers are white, pink, red, or orange, and are produced singly or in large panicles.

Selected species
There are approximately 418 species in this genus, including:
Medinilla acuminata Philippines
Medinilla arboricola China
Medinilla assamica India
Medinilla astronioides Philippines
Medinilla banahaensis Philippines
Medinilla beamanii Borneo
Medinilla brevipendunculata Philippines
Medinilla clemetis Philippines
Medinilla congesta Philippines
Medinilla cordata Philippines
Medinilla cummingii Philippines
Medinilla curtisii
Medinilla dolichophylla Philippines
Medinilla erythrophylla China, Nepal, India
Medinilla fengii China
Medinilla formosana Taiwan
Medinilla fuligineo-glandulifera China
Medinilla hainanensis China
Medinilla halconensis Philippines
 Taiwan
Medinilla himalayana India
Medinilla involucrata Philippines
Medinilla lanceata China
Medinilla luchuenensis China
Medinilla magnifica Philippines

Medinilla malindangensis Philippines
Medinilla merrillii Philippines
Medinilla mindorensis Philippines
Medinilla miniata Philippines
Medinilla multiflora Philippines
Medinilla mytiformis Philippines
Medinilla nana China
Medinilla petelotii China
Medinilla pycnantha Quisumb. & Merr. Philippines
Medinilla ramiflora Philippines
Medinilla rubicunda China
Medinilla scortechinii Philippines
Medinilla sedifolia
Medinilla septentrionalis China
Medinilla speciosa Philippines
Medinilla theresae Philippines
Medinilla venosa Indonesia, Philippines
Medinilla waterhousei Fiji "Tagimaucia"
Medinilla yunnanensis China

References

External links
Renner, S. S. (2004). Multiple Miocene Melastomataceae dispersal between Madagascar, Africa and India. Philos. Trans. R. Soc. Lond. B Biol. Sci. 359(1450): 1485-1494 (pdf file)

 
Melastomataceae genera